Tango Umbrella is the fourth and final studio album by the American alternative metal band American Head Charge, released on March 25, 2016 through Napalm Records. It is the band's final album to feature founding member/bassist Chad Hanks, who died in November 2017.

Background 
Following the band's 2011 reunion and release of the Shoot EP in 2013, an IndieGoGo campaign was started in 2014 as to fund the creation of the album; the target was exceeded by over 110%.

According to the band, "We touched upon different directions. Our influences come from the early '90s -- Ministry, Tool, PJ Harvey and so forth. We cover a lot on Tango Umbrella. If people dig it -- cool. If not: Go F Yourself!"

Reception 

Distorted Sound Magazine rated the album 9 out of 10, stating that the album "isn’t a window back in time, [...] but it is solid proof of the strength of AMERICAN HEAD CHARGE can continue with what they do and still produce solid belters through and through". A review from Cryptic Rock awarded the album 5 out of 5 stars.

A negative review came from Metal Hammer, who gave the record 1.5 stars out of 5: "After such a long wait, it’s a shame they haven’t made a great nu metal record or moved with the times."

Track listing

Personnel 

 Cameron Heacock - vocals
 Karma Chema - guitars
 Ted Hallows - guitars
 Chad Hanks - bass
 Chris Emery - drums
 Justin Fowler - keyboards, sampling

Credits 
 Dave Fortman - production, mixing
 Aaron Zilch - "additional audio terrorism" on Antidote
 Kenny Schalk - drums on Down And Depraved

References 

2016 albums
American Head Charge albums
Albums produced by Dave Fortman